Parivartan is a 1949 Indian Hindi-language film directed by N. R. Acharya, starring Raj Kapoor. It was remade in Hindi under the title Jagriti.

Cast 
 Raj Kapoor
 Nargis

Music

References

External links 
 

1940s Hindi-language films
Indian black-and-white films